Copa João Havelange Group Yellow was one of the three groups of 2000 season's first stage of the Campeonato Brasileiro Série A football league, named Copa João Havelange. It consists of 36 teams divided by 2 groups. 3 teams qualified for the final stage of Copa João Havelange.

Although division of groups is by the popularity of the clubs, Group Yellow contain 17 of 22 Série B clubs in 1999 season, which 4 of the excluded clubs were played in Group Blue. The only exception is Tuna Luso Brasileira. The group also contain top 8 of the past Série C season, except Fluminense (in group Blue) and Club Sportivo Sergipe.

Group A consist of teams from Minas Gerais, Paraná, Rio de Janeiro, Rio Grande do Sul, Santa Catarina and São Paulo.

Group B consist of teams from Amazonas, Alagoas, Ceará, Espírito Santo, Federal District, Goiás, Maranhão, Pará, Pernambuco, Piauí and Rio Grande do Norte.

Teams

Group A

Group B

1 Best Place

First round

Group A

Group B

Knockout stage

Bracket

Third-place match

|}

References
RSSSF

Yellow